Peiraios Street (Odos Peiraios, "Piraeus Street") is a main road in Athens, Greece linking the center of the city with the port of Piraeus. It is part of the system of national roads, as number 56 (abbreviated as EO56). Its length spans 10 km. Major intersections and an interchange include Karaoli Dimitriou Street, Kifissou Avenue, the Konstantinopouleos Avenue junction, Apostolou Pavlou with Vasileiou tou Megalou, Ermou, Thermopylon, Sofokleous, Deligiorgi and Sokratous Street. The island areas of the road are aligned with trees, and historically the avenue runs over parts of the north wall and ancient road of Phaleron.

Places
Piraeus
Moschato
Northern Tavros
Central Athens

Streets in Athens
56